The Mercury Islands are a group of seven islands off the northeast coast of New Zealand's North Island.

History 
The Ngāti Karaua (a hapu of the Ngāti Whanaunga) and the Ngāti Hei inhabited the islands since the 14th century.

A settler claimed to have bought Great Mercury Island in 1839.

Great Mercury (Ahuahu), Kawhitu or Stanley Island and Double Island (Moturehu) were purchased and taken as crown land in 1858–65. These included Whakakapua (73 acres) and Kowhaka (21 acres) being purchased in January 1865. Despite inhabiting Ahuahu, the Ngati Hei were not consulted about this purchase.

A 2017 settlement recognized the Ngāti Hei as having a legitimate claim to Great Mercury Island.

Description
The main chain of the Mercury Islands consists of the large Great Mercury Island (also known as ) to the west, Red Mercury Island to the east, and five much smaller islands between the two (Korapuki, Green, Atiu/Middle, Kawhitu/Stanley and Moturehu/Double Islands). All the islands, except Ahuahu/Great Mercury Island, have statutory protection and are managed by the Department of Conservation as highly valuable Nature Reserves where public access prohibited. Ahuahu/Great Mercury Island is privately owned and public access is allowed (excluding residential sites and the planted pine forest).

Approximately 18,000 years ago during the Last Glacial Maximum when sea levels were over 100 metres lower than present day levels, the islands were hilly features surrounded by a vast coastal plain. Sea levels began to rise 7,000 years ago, after which the islands separated from the rest of New Zealand. When sea levels were lower, the Opitonui River flowed east to the Pacific Ocean between Cuvier Island and Ahuahu/Great Mercury Island.

Ahuahu / Great Mercury Island
Ahuahu / Great Mercury Island, 1872 ha, is the largest of Mercury Islands and the only one with permanent residents or public access. It is the remnants of a Pliocene rhyolitic volcano. In pre-colonial times, the island was the location of at least 20 pā, including Matakawau, a pā on the western side of the island where extensive archaeological excavations were undertaken in the 1950s. During the latter 19th century, the island was a location for kauri gum digging.

The island is owned by Michael Fay and David Richwhite, two prominent New Zealand businessmen. The private island, which features two luxurious residences, can be hired for around $20,000 NZD per day. U2's lead singer Bono and guitarist The Edge stayed on the island during U2's Vertigo concerts in Auckland in November 2006. On 30 November 2009, Ahuahu/Great Mercury Island hosted the first successful launch of Rocket Lab's suborbital Atea-1 sounding rocket.

In 2014, Fay and Richwhite, in partnership with the Department of Conservation, successfully undertook an eradication program to remove kiore, ship rats and cats from the island. In 2016, it was declared pest free, making the entire Mercury Island Group free from introduced mammalian pests. The island remains open to the public to showcase conservation and provide an accessible pest-free island in the Mercury Island Group.

Whakau / Red Mercury Island
The island was briefly used by Count Felix von Luckner as a hiding spot during World War One during his attempted escape from New Zealand en route to the Kermadec Islands, with a cove on the island's northern coast bearing his name to commemorate this. As with the rest of the Mercury Islands, Whakau is volcanic, with evidence of this history evident around the island's coast.

Other islands
The smaller islands in the group have been identified as an Important Bird Area by BirdLife International because they provide nesting sites for up to 3000 breeding pairs of Pycroft's petrels. Moturehu/Double Island and Whakau/Red Mercury are home to the critically endangered Mercury Islands tusked wētā.

See also 
 List of islands of New Zealand

References

External links 
'Geology – New Zealand's Geological History', from An Encyclopaedia of New Zealand, edited by A. H. McLintock, originally published in 1966. Te Ara – The Encyclopedia of New Zealand, updated 2006-09-26. Retrieved 2007-04-15.
 

Volcanoes of Waikato
Thames-Coromandel District
Important Bird Areas of New Zealand
Islands of Waikato
Volcanic islands of New Zealand
Private islands of New Zealand
Miocene volcanoes
Pliocene volcanoes
Pleistocene volcanoes